Kulig is a surname found predominantly in Poland. It may refer to:
Curtis Kulig (born 1981), American artist
Damian Kulig (born 1987), Polish basketball player
Janusz Kulig (born 1967), Polish rally driver
Joanna Kulig (born 1982), Polish actress
Kim Kulig (born 1990), German footballer
Przemysław Kulig (born 1980), Polish footballer

References

See also 
 

Polish-language surnames
Surnames from nicknames